Konduwattuwana Wewa or Kondawattuwana Wewa is an ancient reservoir located in Ampara, Sri Lanka. The site with ancient Buddhist ruins which belonging to the Konduwattuwana reservoir area is a formally recognised an archaeological site in Sri Lanka.

The reservoir is believed to be built during 1st-3rd century BC and had been renovated time to time to facilitate irrigation and drinking water to the nearby area. According to a stone pillar inscription found near the reservoir, the irrigation water of this reservoir was taxed, along with the paddy fields during the reign of King Dappula IV (939 - 940).  Further it reveals that unlawful tapping of irrigation water had also been prohibited by the edict.

Gallery

See also
 List of Archaeological Protected Monuments in Ampara District

References 

Reservoirs in Sri Lanka
Landforms of Eastern Province, Sri Lanka
Archaeological protected monuments in Ampara District
Lakes of Sri Lanka